The Chile national under-20 rugby union team participates in the IRB Junior World Rugby Trophy. Chile has finished among the top three teams several times in the IRB JWRT, and has twice hosted the event.

Current squad

Management
Enrique Larenas - Team Manager
Dalivor Franulic - Assistant Coach
Rodrigo Boye - Assistant Coach
Edmundo Olfos - Assistant Coach
Nicolas Garcia - Physiotherapist
Nicolas Salvo - Team Doctor

2012 Junior World Rugby Trophy

Pool
	53-19	
	54-25	
	41-14

5th Place
 43 - 31

See also
 Rugby union in Chile
 Chilean Rugby Federation
 Chile national rugby union team

External links
 Federación de Rugby de Chile

Chile national rugby union team
National under-20 rugby union teams
Youth sport in Chile

https://web.archive.org/web/20130727142030/http://kerikerirugby.com/2013/stage-is-set-in-chile-for-irb-junior-world-rugby-trophy-2013/